Switzerland will send a delegation to compete at the 2010 Winter Paralympics in Vancouver, British Columbia, Canada. The country will field a total of fifteen athletes (ten men and five women) in four of the Games' five sports: alpine skiing, biathlon, cross-country skiing and wheelchair curling. This makes it a slightly smaller delegation than in 2006 (19 athletes) or 2002 (18). Switzerland's stated aim is to obtain two medals.

Alpine skiing 

Women

Men

Biathlon

Cross-country skiing 

Switzerland will enter two competitors in cross-country skiing.

Wheelchair curling

See also
Switzerland at the 2010 Winter Olympics

References

External links
Vancouver 2010 Paralympic Games official website
International Paralympic Committee official website

Nations at the 2010 Winter Paralympics
2010
Paralympics